Snelsmore is a hamlet in Berkshire, England, and part of the civil parish of Chieveley.

Transport
Bus travel from Newbury is provided by Newbury and District service 107.

References

Hamlets in Berkshire
Chieveley